, known by the stage name , was a Japanese actor. He was born in Kitazawa, Setagaya (now Kitazawa, Setagaya, Tokyo), Ehara, Tokyo Prefecture. He formerly belonged to Gekidan Haiyūza.

Biography
After dropping out of Waseda University's department of theater, Takita debuted in 1953 as a second-grader training institute for Gekidan Haiyūza. His synchronization included Akiji Kobayashi, Akio Satake, Toru Takeuchi, Yoshio Tsuchiya, Hisashi Yokomori, etc. Takita became popular in the TV drama Jiken Kisha who appeared from 1956 to 1964. In the period dramas such as Mito Kōmon and Abarenbō Shōgun, he often played villains, but in recent years there were many opportunities to play the role of good people. In addition, Takita was also active as a voice actor, voice of neurosurgeon Ben Casey of hero in overseas drama Ben Casey, and the films Star Wars, Haunted Mansion, Jaws and many hit the main characters and important characters' voices in hits.

Takita was diagnosed with ureter cancer in the summer of 2014 and had surgery. Takita's metastasis was discovered in April 2015. He died at a hospital in Naka Ward, Yokohama City on 3 May, the same year at 11:34 am, from cancer. Takita was 84 when he died.

Filmography (acting)

TV dramas

Films

Stage

Advertisements

Voice acting

Dubbing

Actors
 Roy Scheider

Films, dramas

Anime films

Radio dramas

Narration

References

External links

Yūsuke Takita – allcinema 
Yūsuke Takita – Kinenote 

Yūsuke Takita Movie Walker 
Yūsuke Takita - TV Drama Database 

Japanese male film actors
Japanese male stage actors
Japanese male television actors
Japanese male voice actors
Male actors from Tokyo
1930 births
2015 deaths
20th-century Japanese male actors
21st-century Japanese male actors